Darrow & Darrow is an American/Canadian series of mystery TV movies created by Phoef Sutton and starring Kimberly Williams-Paisley as idealistic lawyer Claire Darrow and Tom Cavanagh as Miles Strasburg, the Assistant District Attorney. The series airs on the Hallmark Movies & Mysteries channel in the US.

Cast

Main 
 Kimberly Williams-Paisley as Claire Darrow, an idealistic lawyer who fights cases she believes in
 Tom Cavanagh as Miles Strasburg, Assistant District Attorney
 Wendie Malick as Joanna Darrow, Claire's estranged mother who returns from New York City and re-enters her daughter's life
 Lilah Fitzgerald as Louise "Lou", Claire's young daughter

Recurring 
 Barclay Hope as Raymond, a colleague of Claire's at Darrow & Darrow
 Antonio Cayonne as Chester, a computer expert who works at Darrow & Darrow
 Vincent Dangerfield as Scott, an investigator who works at Darrow & Darrow
 Gelsea Mae as Zoey Jihara, an ex-Marine who works at Darrow & Darrow
 Brandi Alexander as Winnie
 MacKenzie Porter as Phoebe, Miles' half sister and a singer
 Veena Sood as D.A. Ruth Ashland

Production and filming 
Parts of the first film were shot in Vancouver, British Columbia, Canada.

Films

References

External links
 

American film series
American mystery films
American television films
Canadian mystery films
Canadian television films
Hallmark Channel original programming
Hallmark Channel original films